NPO Mashinostroyeniya is a rocket design bureau based in Reutov, Russia.  During the Cold War it was responsible for several major weapons systems, including the UR-100N Intercontinental ballistic missile and the military Almaz space station program.

India is Mashinostroyeniya's second largest customer after the Russian Federation for sale of P-70 Ametist, BrahMos, BrahMos-II and P-800 Oniks.

History
NPO Mashinostroyeniya was founded in 1944 to develop rockets for the Russian military. Under the leadership of cruise missile designer Vladimir Chelomey, the firm was lead developer of the Soviet Union's space satellites, cruise missiles, and intercontinental ballistic missiles. Originally part of the OKB-51 design bureau, it relocated to Reutov, and from 1955 to 1966 was designated OKB-52 (and also OKB-52 MAP). OKB-52 became later known as TsKBM.

The OKB-52 was the main rival of OKB-1 (then the design bureau of Sergei Korolev, later renamed TsKBEM, today RSC Energia) during the Soviet human lunar programs and the Soviet space station program.

At its peak in the mid-1980s, NPO Mashinostroyeniya employed nearly 10,000. By the mid-1980s state support for NPO was dwindling. In the 1980s, the Soviet government directed NPO to develop vegetable oil processing equipment, baking industry equipment, and food storage products. By 1993, Mashinostroyeniya's defense orders dwindled to one-fifth of previous levels.

Spacecraft

Air launched orbital vehicles 
 17K-AM

Crewed spacecraft 
 VA spacecraft

Space launched vehicles 
 Strela (rocket)
 UR-100
 UR-200

Missiles

Anti-ship missiles 
 P-70 Ametist (NATO codename: SS-N-7 Starbright)
 P-120 Malakhit (NATO codename: SS-N-9 Siren)
 P-500 Bazalt (NATO codename: SS-N-12 Sandbox)
 P-700 Granit (NATO codename: SS-N-19 Shipwreck)
 P-800 Oniks (NATO codename: SS-N-26)
 Zircon (missile)

United States sanctions
On July 16, 2014, the Obama administration imposed sanctions through the US Department of Treasury's Office of Foreign Assets Control (OFAC) by adding NPO Mashinostroyeniya and other entities to the Specially Designated Nationals List (SDN) in retaliation for the ongoing Russo-Ukrainian War.

See also 
 Proton satellite
 KSShch
 BrahMos
 10Kh

External links
Company web site: www.npomash.ru
NPO Mashinostroyeniya at the Nuclear Threat Initiative web-site

References

Space industry companies of Russia
Defence companies of the Soviet Union
Guided missile manufacturers
Reutov
Tactical Missiles Corporation
Companies based in Moscow Oblast
Design bureaus
Russian entities subject to the U.S. Department of the Treasury sanctions
Research institutes in the Soviet Union